James Wilson (19 December 1929 – 2017) was a Scottish professional footballer who played in the Football League for Mansfield Town.

References

1929 births
2017 deaths
Scottish footballers
Association football forwards
English Football League players
Duntocher Hibernian F.C. players
Alloa Athletic F.C. players
Leicester City F.C. players
Mansfield Town F.C. players
Dundee United F.C. players